IBAC is a method of placing digital communication signals on channels in the existing analog communication bands.  While this technique can also be applied to other radio frequency bands, no country has yet done so.

See also
Digital subchannels
In-band on-channel (IBOC)

Digital television